Jackalope (American) – Rabbit with antlers
 Jack-In-Irons (English) – Malevolent giant
 Jack-o'-lantern (Medieval folklore) – Vegetal lantern
 Jaculus (Medieval Bestiaries) – Winged serpent or small dragon
 Jasconius (Medieval folklore) – Island-sized fish
 Jasy Jaterei (Guaraní) – Nature guardian and bogeyman
 Jatayu (Hindu mythology) – Vulture demigod
 Jaud (Slavic) – Vampirised premature baby
 Jenglot (Java) – Vampiric little people
 Jengu (Sawa) – Water spirit
 Jentil (Basque) – Megalith-building giant
 Jenu (Mi'kmaq) – Anthropophagous giant
 Jerff (Swedish) – Gluttonous dog-cat-fox hybrid
 Jersey Devil (American) – Demonic dragon or flying demon who was given birth to by an American living in New Jersey
Jian (Chinese) – One-eyed, one-winged bird who requires a mate for survival
 Jiangshi (Chinese) – Life-draining, reanimated corpse
 Jiaolong (Chinese) – Dragon
 Jibakurei (Japanese) – Spirit that protects a specific place
 Jievaras (Lithuanian) – House spirit
 Jikininki (Japanese) – Corpse-eating ghost
 Jinn (Arabian, Islamic) – Spiritual creatures; genii
 Jipijka'm (Mi'kmaq) – Underwater horned snake; lives in lakes and eats humans
 Jiufeng (Chinese) – Nine-headed bird worshiped by ancient natives in Hubei Province.
 Jiu tou niao (Chinese) – Nine-headed, demonic bird
 Jogah (Iroquois) – Little people nature spirit
 Jörmungandr (Norse) – Sea serpent
 Jorōgumo (Japanese) – Spider woman
 Jotai (Japanese) – Animated folding screen cloth
 Jötunn (Norse) – Gigantic nature spirits
 Jujak (Korean) – Bird
 Jumbee (Guyanese) – Malevolent spirit

J